June Rozelle Johnson (May 28, 1918 – July 14, 1987) was an American film actress from 1936 to 1941 who appeared in Western films and serials. She made 14 films including three in which she was the female lead alongside The Three Mesquiteers. These were Lone Star Raiders (1940), Pals of the Pecos (1941)  and Gangs of Sonora (1941). Her father was Chic Johnson, a vaudeville comedian who was well known as one of the Olsen and Johnson duo.

Filmography
 The President's Mystery (1936) – undetermined role (uncredited)
 Rose Bowl (1936) as girl (uncredited)
 The Big Show (1936) as studio secretary

 Beware of Ladies (1936) as young girl (uncredited)
 The Mandarin Mystery (1936) as girl in cocktail bar
 Jim Hanvey, Detective (1937) as June (uncredited)
 Gunsmoke Ranch (1937) as settler girl (uncredited)
 Anything for a Thrill (1937) as Jean Roberts
 Double Danger (1938) as 'Babs' Theron
 Vivacious Lady (1938) as Miss Barton – botany student (uncredited)
 The First Chair (1938; short) as Ann Dunn
 Lone Star Raiders (1940) as Linda Cameron
 Pals of the Pecos (1941) as June Burke
 Gangs of Sonora (1941) as June Conners

References

External links
 
 

1918 births
1987 deaths
20th-century American actresses
American film actresses
Film serial actresses
Western (genre) film actresses